Ellen Dymphna Cusack AM (21 September 1902 – 19 October 1981) was an Australian writer and playwright.

Personal life
Born in Wyalong, New South Wales, Cusack was educated at Saint Ursula's College, Armidale, New South Wales and graduated from the University of Sydney with an honours degree in arts and a diploma in Education. She worked as a teacher until she retired in 1944 for health reasons. Her illness was confirmed in 1978 as multiple sclerosis. She died at Manly, New South Wales on 19 October 1981.

Career

Cusack wrote twelve novels (two of which were collaborations), eleven plays, three travel books, two children's books and one non-fiction book. Her collaborative novels were Pioneers on Parade (1939) with Miles Franklin, and Come In Spinner (1951) with Florence James.

The play Red Sky at Morning was filmed in 1944, starring Peter Finch. The biography Caddie, the Story of a Barmaid, to which Cusack wrote an introduction and helped the author write, was produced as the film Caddie in 1976. The novel Come In Spinner was produced as a television series by the Australian Broadcasting Corporation in 1989, and broadcast in March 1990.

Family
Her younger brother, John, was also an author, writing the war novel They Hosed Them Out under the pseudonym John Beede, which was first published in 1965; an expanded edition under the author's real name, John Bede Cusack, was published in 2012 by Wakefield Press, edited and annotated by Robert Brokenmouth.

Activism
Cusack advocated social reform and described the need for reform in her writings. She contributed to the world peace movement during the Cold War era as an antinuclear activist. She and her husband Norman Freehill were members of the Communist Party and they left their entire estates to the Party in their wills.

Contribution and recognition
Cusack was a foundation member of the Australian Society of Authors in 1963. She had refused an Order of the British Empire, but was made a Member of the Order of Australia in 1981 for her contribution to Australian literature.

In 2011, Cusack was one of 11 authors, including Elizabeth Jolley and Manning Clark, to be permanently recognised by the addition of brass plaques at the Writers' Walk, Sydney.

Plays
 Safety First, 1927
 Shallow Cups, 1933
 Anniversary, 1935
 Red Sky at Morning, performed 1935; published 1942
 Morning Sacrifice, 1943
 Comets Soon Pass, 1943
 Call Up Your Ghosts, with Miles Franklin, 1945
 Pacific Paradise, 1955

Novels
 Jungfrau (1936)
 Pioneers on Parade (1939) with Miles Franklin
 Come In Spinner (1951) with Florence James
 Say No to Death (1951)
 Southern Steel (1953)
 Caddie, the Story of a Barmaid (1953) [Introduction only]
 The Sun in Exile (1955)
 Heatwave in Berlin (1961)
 Picnic Races (1962)
 Black Lightning (1964)
 The Sun is Not Enough (1967)
 The Half-Burnt Tree (1969)
 A Bough in Hell (1971)

Nonfiction
 Chinese Women Speak. Angus & Robertson. Sydney. 1958.
 Holidays Among the Russians. Heinemann. London. 1964.
 Illyria Reborn. Heinemann. London. 1966.
 Mary Gilmore A Tribute. Australasian Book Society. London. 1965.
 A Window in the Dark. National Library of Australia. Canberra. 1991.

Children's literature
 Kanga-Bee and Kanga-Bo. Botany House. Sydney. 1945.
 Four Winds and a Family  with Florence James. Shakespeare Head Press. London. 1947.

References

Sources
 Dymphna Cusack bibliography
 North, Marilla. (2007) "Cusack, Ellen Dymphna (Nell) (1902–1981)". Entry in the Australian Dictionary of Biography. Melbourne: Melbourne University Press
 Spender, Dale (1988) Writing a New World: Two Centuries of Australian Women Writers, London: Pandora

1902 births
1981 deaths
Australian biographers
Australian women novelists
Members of the Order of Australia
University of Sydney alumni
Writers from New South Wales
20th-century Australian novelists
Women biographers
Australian women dramatists and playwrights
20th-century Australian women writers
20th-century Australian dramatists and playwrights
20th-century biographers